Bolívar Canton is a canton of Ecuador, located in Carchi Province.  Its capital is the town of Bolívar.  Its population at the 2001 census was 13,898 and in 2010 was 14,347.

Aside from Bolívar itself, the canton contains the rural parishes of García Moreno, Los Andes, Monte Olivo, San Rafael and San Vicente de Pusir.

Demographics
Ethnic groups as of the Ecuadorian census of 2010:
Mestizo  78.9%
Afro-Ecuadorian  18.0%
White  2.2%
Indigenous  0.7%
Montubio  0.2%
Other  0.0%

References

Cantons of Carchi Province